The X-Files Trivia Game is a board game published by 20th Century Fox Home Entertainment. In the game, players roll a four-sided die to randomly select a question-category. The game has been released in many countries, all in their respectively spoken languages.

Card Game
Board games introduced in 1997
Multiplayer games
Roll-and-move board games
Tabletop games